Politécnico metro station is a Mexico City Metro station in Gustavo A. Madero, Mexico City. It is followed by Instituto del Petróleo station. Politécnico station serves the colonias (neighborhoods) of Industrial Vallejo and Nueva Industrial Vallejo. The station's pictogram features the logo of the National Polytechnic Institute (IPN), a public university in Mexico City, and its name is on account of its proximity to the main campus.

Politécnico metro station was opened on  1982, on the first day of the Politécnico–Pantitlán service. The station is partially accessible and there is also a mural inside titled La técnica al servicio de la patria by José Luis Elías Jáuregui. In 2019, the station had an average daily ridership of 34,586 passengers, making it the 28th busiest station in the network and the second busiest of the line, after Pantitlán.

Location
Politécnico is a metro station located along Eje Central (in the section formerly named 100 Metros Avenue), in Gustavo A. Madero, in northern Mexico City. The station serves the colonias (Mexican Spanish for "neighborhoods") of Industrial Vallejo and Nueva Industrial Vallejo. Within the system, the station is followed by Instituto del Petróleo station. It is also serviced by a Centro de transferencia modal (CETRAM), a type of transport hub, and by Routes 23 and 103 of the Red de Transporte de Pasajeros network.

There were plans to have a Cablebús station inside the National Polytechnic Institute (IPN), a public university near the station. However, it was canceled due to the opposition of students.

Exits
There are two exits:
East: Eje Central (100 Metros Avenue) and Diana Street, Nueva Industrial Vallejo.
West: Eje Central (100 Metros Avenue) and Poniente 152 Street, Industrial Vallejo.

Landmarks

Inside the station, there is a mural painted by José Luis Elías Jáuregui and named La técnica al servicio de la patria, a reference to the IPN's motto. The mural was inaugurated in 1996 and depicts the history of the IPN, its culture and campus life, the Once TV network logo and the image of Lázaro Cárdenas, the 51st president of Mexico and founder of the university.

History and construction
 of the Mexico City Metro was built by Cometro, a subsidiary of Empresas ICA, and its last section was opened on  1982, operating from Pantitlán to Politécnico stations. The station's pictogram represents a 2D version of the IPN logo. The station is partially accessible for people with disabilities.

In June 2006, Metro authorities replaced the railroad switches; in 2008, they had maintenance work done on the station's roof.

During the 1980s and 1990s, it was proposed to expand Line 5 northbound towards the municipality of Tlalnepantla de Baz, in the State of Mexico, from Politécnico metro station. The expansion was proposed again for the 2018 master plan.

Incidents
On 9 March 2016, two cars derailed when the driver performed a parking maneuver at Politécnico station. One of the tires of the penultimate car jammed with the tracks. There were around 200 passengers inside the train with no casualties due to the low speed at which it operated.

On 8 November 2020, Politécnico, Instituto del Petróleo and Lindavista stations were vandalized during feminist demonstrations; walls, screens, handrails, a train, and part of the La técnica al servicio de la patria mural were damaged and graffitied.

Ridership
According to the data provided by the authorities since the 2000s, Politécnico station has been one of the busiest stations of the system's 195 stations. In the last decade, commuters have averaged per year between 30,200 and 37,100 daily entrances. In 2019, before the impact of the COVID-19 pandemic on public transport, the station's ridership totaled 12,624,212 passengers, which was an increase of 187,687 passengers compared to 2018. In the same year, Politécnico metro station was the 28th busiest of the system and it was the line's 2nd busiest after Pantitlán.

Notes

References

External links

1982 establishments in Mexico
Accessible Mexico City Metro stations
Mexico City Metro Line 5 stations
Mexico City Metro stations in Gustavo A. Madero, Mexico City
Railway stations in Mexico at university and college campuses
Railway stations opened in 1982